Faouzi Kojmane better known by his stage name Zifou, (born in Sedan, Ardennes, France on 20 July 1992) is a French rapper of Moroccan origin signed to Universal Music France's Division AZ.

He grew up in Roissy-en-Brie and in Pontault-Combault. He gained fame through his online postings in particular his May 2011 posting of "Chicha toute la nuit".

In July 2012, he released his debut official single "C'est la hass" on Universal Music France followed by "On donne ça" that featured Léa Castel.

Discography

Albums

Singles

Other songs
2011: "Chicha toute la nuit"

References

External links 
 

1992 births
Living people
French rappers
French people of Moroccan descent